William Strong House may refer to:

William Strong House (Preston, Minnesota), listed on the National Register of Historic Places in Fillmore County, Minnesota
William Strong House (Spring Valley, Minnesota), listed on the National Register of Historic Places in Fillmore County, Minnesota

See also
Strong House (disambiguation)